Huerto is a municipality located in the Monegros comarca, province of Huesca, Aragon, Spain. According to the 2004 census (INE), the municipality has a population of 253 inhabitants.

Villages
Huerto
Usón 
Venta de Ballerías

References

Municipalities in the Province of Huesca